Sorin Ciprian Bucuroaia (born 3 February 1978) is a Romanian former professional footballer who played as a midfielder for teams such as Extensiv Craiova, ARO Câmpulung, Gaz Metan Mediaș, Gloria Bistrița or Zimbru Chișinău, among others. He is currently the manager of Liga II side Daco-Getica București.

Honours
Argeș Pitești
 Liga II: 2007–08

References

External links
 
 

1978 births
Living people
Footballers from Bucharest
Romanian footballers
Association football midfielders
Liga I players
CS Gaz Metan Mediaș players
ACF Gloria Bistrița players
FC Dinamo București players
Liga II players
FC Drobeta-Turnu Severin players
FC Caracal (2004) players
CS Inter Gaz București players
FC Argeș Pitești players
Nemzeti Bajnokság I players
Lombard-Pápa TFC footballers
Moldovan Super Liga players
FC Zimbru Chișinău players
Romanian expatriate footballers
Romanian expatriate sportspeople in Hungary
Expatriate footballers in Hungary
Romanian expatriate sportspeople in Moldova
Expatriate footballers in Moldova
Romanian football managers
Romanian expatriate football managers